Đakus is a village in the municipality of Žitorađa, Serbia. According to the 2002 census, the village has a population of 904  people.

References

Populated places in Toplica District